An interval signal, or tuning signal, is a characteristic sound or musical phrase used in international broadcasting, numbers stations, and by some domestic broadcasters, played before commencement or during breaks in transmission, but most commonly between programmes in different languages.

It serves several purposes:
 It helps a listener using a radio with an analog tuner to find the correct frequency.
 It informs other stations that the frequency is in use.
 It serves as a station identifier even if the language used in the subsequent broadcast is not one the listener understands.

The practise began in Europe in the 1920s and 1930s and was carried over into shortwave broadcasts. The use of interval signals has declined with the advent of digital tuning systems, but has not vanished. Interval signals were not required on commercial channels in the United States, where jingles were used as identification.

List of interval signals by station 
  Radiodifusión Argentina al Exterior: First eight notes of "Mi Buenos Aires querido" by Carlos Gardel, followed by people saying the station's name in eight languages.

 :
 China National Radio and China Radio International: Chime version of March of the Volunteers.

 Voice of the Strait News Radio: Bell version of "Three Rules of Discipline and Eight Points for Attention".

  Radio Habana Cuba: Melody of "March of the 26th of July" by Agustín Díaz Cartaya.
  DR P1: "Drømte mig en drøm i nat", played on xylophone.

  Radio France Internationale: Electronic-disco, culminating in the last 8 measures of "La Marseillaise".
  Deutsche Welle: Celesta version of "Es sucht der Bruder seine Brüder" from Fidelio by Ludwig van Beethoven.

  Voice of Greece: "The Little Shepherd", played on floghera.
  All India Radio: A tune composed by Walter Kaufmann or Thakur Balwant Singh, used since 1936.

  Radio Republik Indonesia: "Solace on Coconut Island", composed by Ismail Marzuki. Interval signals may vary by province.
  RTÉ Radio 1: Chime version of "O'Donnell Forever".
  Radio Japan:
 "Kazoe-uta" (counting-out game).
  "Sakura Sakura" (cherry blossoms).

 
 Voice of Korea: Melody of "Song of General Kim Il-sung".
 : Melody of "Song of General Kim Jong-il".

  KBS World Radio: "Dawn".
  RTL Radio: "De Feierwon" by Michel Lentz, played on chimes.
  Voice of Mongolia: "Motherland".

  Radio New Zealand International: The call of a New Zealand bellbird
  Radio Pakistan

 :
 Far East Broadcasting Company: "We Have Heard the Joyful Sound".
 Radio Veritas Asia: "O via, vita, veritas".

  Radio Romania International: The first nine notes of “Pui de lei", lyrics by Ioan S. Nenițescu and song by 
 
 Radio Mayak: Vibraphone version of Moscow Nights.
 Radio Sakha: Excerpt from a Yakut folk song.

  Radio Slovenia: Electronically generated cuckoo chirping.
  Radio Ukraine International: "".
  BBC World Service:
 English programme: "Bow Bells".
 Non-English programme, non-Europe: "Lillibullero", three notes tuned B–B–C.
 Non-English programme, to Europe: four notes tuned B–B–B–E.

 :
 NBC: 3 chime-like notes.

 Trans World Radio: "What a Friend We Have in Jesus".
 Voice of America: Brass band version of "Yankee Doodle".

 WEWN, later EWTN Global Radio: "Salve Regina"

  Vatican Radio: "Christus Vincit", played on celesta.

  Radio Nacional de Venezuela's : Beginning of "Alma Llanera" by Pedro Elías Gutiérrez and Rafael Bolívar Coronado.

Formerly used 
  Radio Tirana: Këputa një gjethe dafine (transmission intro) and the trumpet version of With Pickaxe and Rifle.

  Radio Australia: Chimes version of Waltzing Matilda (chorus), Kookaburra call. News signature tune: Majestic Fanfare.
  Radio Österreich International: Orchestral version of An der schönen blauen Donau ("Blue Danube Waltz") by Johann Strauss.

  Ö1: Three notes signifying O–R–F by Werner Pirchner, played on viola.

  RTBF International: .
  Rádio Nacional: Luar do Sertão ("Hinterlands Moonlight").
  Radio Canada International: First four notes of O Canada, played on piano or autoharp.

  Radio Peking (predecessor of China Radio International): Chimes version of 东方红 ("The East Is Red").

  Cyprus Broadcasting Corporation: Avkoritsa by Andreas Mappouras, played on guitar
  Radio Prague
 Trumpet version of Kupředu levá ("Forward, Left") by Jan Seidl

 Adagio – Allegro molto from Symphony No. 9 by Dvořák.

  Yle Radio 1: Pim-pam-pulla by A. O. Väisänen.

  Radio France Internationale: Trumpet version of a popular song, .

  Nordwestdeutscher Rundfunk: The 4th symphony by Brahms.

  : Ending bars of Volk ans Gewehr, played on glockenspiel.

 
 Berliner Rundfunk: Motif from the opera Regina by Albert Lortzing, played by trumpets.
 Radio Berlin International: Beginning of Auferstanden aus Ruinen ("Risen from Ruins"), played on chimes.

 Radio DDR: First few bars of Wann wir schreiten Seit’ an Seit’.
 Radio NTS
 

 : "Ode to Joy"
 

  Deutschlandfunk: Celesta version of Dir, Land voll Lieb' und Leben from "Ich hab' mich ergeben" by Hans Ferdinand Maßmann.

  Radio Budapest: Excerpts from the suite 1848 by T.K. Polgar played on three trumpets and two cornets.

  Kol Yisrael: Trumpet and drum version of Hatikvah.

  Rai Italia Radio: Mechanically generated canary chirping.
  Trans World Radio: Hymne Monégasque

 
 NPO: First seven notes of Wilhelmus, played on clarinet (Radio 1 and Radio 5), synthesizer (Radio 3), spinet (Radio 4) and flute (Radio 2).
 Radio Netherlands: Carillon version of the Eighty Years' War song Merck toch hoe sterck.

 
 NRK P1: Motif from Sigurd Josarfal by Edvard Grieg.
 Radio Norway International (former international service of NRK): Ancient folk tune from the Hallingdal region.

 
 Radio Katowice: Sound of a hammer striking an anvil.
 : Excerpt from O Warmio moja miła by Feliks Nowowiejski, played on barrel organ.
 Polish Radio External Service: Excerpt from Prząśniczka by Stanisław Moniuszko, played on piano.
 Radio Polonia: Piano version of Etude No. 12 ("Revolutionary Etude") by Frédéric Chopin.

  Radio Bucharest 1 and Radio Bucharest External Service (pre 1989): Fragment from Cantata anilor luminǎ by Anatol Vieru
  Voice of Russia: "Majestic" chorus from the "Great Gate of Kiev" portion of Pictures at an Exhibition by Mussorgsky.
  Radio Serbia: Bože pravde.
  Radio Slovakia International: Kto za pravdu horí.
  Radio RSA (former international service of Apartheid-era South African Broadcasting Corporation): Bokmakierie chirping and first bars of Ver in die Wereld, Kittie, played on guitar.

  Radio Sweden: Chime version of Ut i vida världen ("Out in the Wide World"), composed by Ralph Lundsten and the opening notes of Carl Michael Bellman's Storm och böljor tystna r'en.
 
 : D' Zit isch do, played on music box.
 Swiss Radio International: Lueget, vo Berg und Tal.

  Voice of Turkey: Turkish makam, played on piano.
 

  Radio Moscow (former international service of the Soviet Union):
 Подмосковные вечера ("Moscow Nights"), played on vibraphone.
 Песня о Родине ("Wide Is My Motherland")

  BBC World Service: Trumpet version of Oranges and Lemons, first four notes of Symphony No. 5 by Beethoven, played on timpani; Lillibullero (signature tune, played on trumpet).
  WYFR: First two bars of To God Be the Glory by William Howard Doane played by a brass band
  Radio Yugoslavia (1980–1989): First bar of Druže Tito, ljubićice bjela anonymous Partisan song, in various orchestral renditions.
   Radio Yugoslavia, later International Radio of Serbia and Montenegro: Jugoslavijo by Nikola Hercigonja.

Classical radio station WQXR-FM in New York City, during its ownership by The New York Times Company, played different variations of a classical infused gong with the ID read at the same time as "The Classical Station of the New York Times, WQXR, New York (And WQXR.com 2000–2009)

Numbers station interval signals 
Numbers stations are often named after their interval signals, such as The Lincolnshire Poacher or Magnetic Fields after "Magnetic Fields Part 1" by Jean-Michel Jarre.

References

Further reading

External links 

 Interval Signals Online
 Nobuyuki Kawamura's Interval Signal Library
 IntervalSignal DataBase (German) English version
 Uwe Volk's Sound Library (available both in English and in German)
 Kurzwelle-Historisch
 Interval signals on Live-Radio.net

International broadcasting
Audiovisual ephemera